Concentration is a game show series that aired on Australian television networks.  The game show based on the children's memory game of the same name. Matching cards represented prizes that contestants could win. As matching pairs of cards were gradually removed from the board, it would slowly reveal elements of a rebus puzzle that contestants had to solve to win a match.
It aired on the Nine Network in 1959 until 1967 later aired on the Seven Network in 1970 until revived in 1997. It was hosted by Philip Brady, then in the 1970s with Lionel Williams, and then again in 1997 with Mike Hammond.

References

External Links

Nine Network original programming
Seven Network original programming
Black-and-white Australian television shows
1959 Australian television series debuts
1967 Australian television series endings
1970 Australian television series debuts
1970 Australian television series endings
1997 Australian television series debuts
1997 Australian television series endings
1950s Australian game shows
1960s Australian game shows
1970s Australian game shows
1990s Australian game shows
Australian television series revived after cancellation
English-language television shows